John Carter (born 1970) is an American multidisciplinary, conceptual artist and film director, using the professional name Carter for his artworks. He is based in New York City.

About 
Carter was born in Norwich, Connecticut and studied at the Maryland Institute College of Art (MICA), earning a Bachelor of Fine Arts degree in 1992. He then studied at the artists residency, Skowhegan School of Painting and Sculpture in 1994. Carter earned an M.F.A. degree in 1997 at University of California, Davis.

Carter is best known for his artwork that spans various media from painting and photography to sculptural installations, film and video. His works have been exhibited internationally, including the Whitney Museum of American Art in New York, Museum of Modern Art, New York, Tate Modern, London, San Francisco Museum of Modern Art, the USA Today and Abstract America exhibitions, at the Saatchi Gallery in London, England. His works have also been shown at the Royal Academy in London and the Museion in Bolzano, Italy.

A comprehensive catalogue of Carter's work edited by Georg Kargl was published in 2008 titled, An Arm with Hair, (The Vienna Catalogue 1973). Publication Studios in 2009 published Carter's "California Film: 1996".

Film direction
Carter's first feature film, Erased James Franco was released in 2008. It stars the American actor, James Franco in a performance that has him reenact every film and television appearance from his entire career. The film also features Franco playing the part of Julianne Moore as her character in the film Safe directed by Todd Haynes and as Rock Hudson in the 1966 film Seconds.

James Franco's appearances as a version of 'himself' on the daytime soap opera, General Hospital was inspired by Carter and can be seen as another facet or an extension of the work that began with the film, Erased James Franco.

Maladies, written and directed by Carter was filmed in New York in December 2010. It stars Catherine Keener, James Franco, David Strathairn, Alan Cumming, Fallon Goodson and Mary Beth Peil and its soundtrack was composed by J Ralph. In 2013, Maladies, premiered at the Berlin International Film Festival and the SXSW film festival in Austin, Texas and was released theatrically and VOD through Tribeca Films in March, 2014.

Carter's Polaroid photography can be seen in the traveling exhibition, The Polaroid Years: Instant Photography and Experimentation and in the publication The Polaroid Years: Instant Photography and Experimentation.

References

External links
 Official website
"Carter: "Beside Myself" at Lisa Cooley" by R. Thurmann, ArtObserved, April 22, 2014
Negative Thinking by Dennis Lim, Artforum, April, 2009
Carter: A Couple of Random Characters in Search of an Author by, Susan Miller, Sightlines, 2012
Carter at Salon 94, Freemans by, Morgan Falconer, Frieze, May 10, 2009
Director Carter on "Maladies" & Making Art with James Franco by, Miranda Siegel, Bullett, February 13, 2013
In a Word: Carter by Aaron Krach, Advocate, April 6, 2009
Carter interview, FILMMAKER magazine, 2013 by Alexandra Byer, March 12, 2013
Negative Thinking by, Dennis Lim, Artforum, April 8, 2009
Erased JF by, David Ng, Los Angeles Times, April 21, 2009

1970 births
Living people
Maryland Institute College of Art alumni
Modern painters
People from Norwich, Connecticut
University of California, Davis alumni